WKXH (105.5 FM) is a radio station broadcasting a New Country format. Licensed to St. Johnsbury, Vermont, United States, the station is owned by Vermont Broadcast Associates, Inc.

History
The station was assigned the call letters WNKV on April 10, 1985; it signed on August 1. On June 6, 1998, the station changed its call sign to the current WKXH.

References

External links

 Kix 105.5 WKXH on Facebook

KXH
Radio stations established in 1985
1985 establishments in Vermont
Country radio stations in the United States